Centre Sportif de Colovray Nyon is where FC Stade Nyonnais play their home football and rugby games. The site is opposite the UEFA headquarters. The centre has six pitches for different things and hosts a variety of activities, football, rugby and athletics. The stadium has 860 seats and the rest is standing places.

Events 
In 2008, for the UEFA Euro 2008, Turkey had their base camp at this ground.

In June 2009, the ground hosted the 2009 UEFA Women's Under-17 Championship, with Germany and Spain reaching the final.

Since the 2013–14 season, the stadium hosts the final match of the UEFA Youth League.

The stadium hosted the preliminary round of the 2020–21 UEFA Champions League.

See also 
 List of football stadiums in Switzerland

References

External links
 https://web.archive.org/web/20130908084646/http://www.stadenyonnais.ch/centre_sportif/presentation.asp

Football venues in Switzerland
Rugby union stadiums in Switzerland
Buildings and structures in the canton of Vaud
Nyon